Carmel City Hall, is the seat of the municipal government of Carmel-by-the-Sea, California. It is a historic commercial building in the Carmel downtown district, located on Monte Verde Street and 7th Avenue. It is a good example of Shingle and American Craftsman architectural that was built in the 1910s. The building qualified as an important building in the city's downtown historic district property survey and was recorded with the California Register of Historical Resources on November 22, 2002.

History

The Carmel City Hall was first established in July 1913 as the All Saints Episcopal Church located on Monte Verde Street and 7th Avenue in Carmel-by-the-Sea, California. It is a one-story, steep-pitched gable roof, wood-framed building with exterior wood shingles and textured cement stucco. The entrance to the building is made up of concrete steps and wrought iron railings. The  building was designed by Albert Cauldwell, a San Francisco architect and constructed by master builder Michael J. Murphy for $1,200. Between 1917-1928, Murphy expanded the building and added a parish hall and two decorative wooden arches. A vestibule and church bell tower were added in 1928 and removed in 1953 by architect George Wilcox who completed a remodel to make it look less like a church. A parking lot was added in 1956. Bay Area architect Albert Henry Hill, made additions to the south side elevation for the Planning Department in 1973. The last major remodel was done in 1985 by local architects Fred Keeble and George Rhoda.

The building qualified for inclusion in the city's Downtown Historic District Property Survey, and was registered with the California Register of Historical Resources on November 22, 2002. The building qualifies as significant under the California Register criterion 1, in the area of history as the seat of government and center of political activity since 1946.

The Carmel City Hall conducted business from rented space since its incorporation in 1916. Carmel's first "official" city hall was in the Philip Wilson Building from 1917 to 1927, then from the second floor of the T.A. Oakes Building from 1927 to 1946. On September 6, 1946, Mayor Frederick M. Godwin and the city council purchased the All Saints Episcopal Church building and two vacant lots for a permanent city hall for $40,000. In 1946, the city hall opened the first planning commission that included the first poet mayor Herbert Heron, Master builder Hugh W. Comstock, conservationist Clara Kellogg, and Florence Josselyn. The group formalized many of Carmel's zoning codes. In 1958 the Arts and Forestry commissions were established. In 1964, the city purchased the Sunset School for a cultural center. Herbert Heron served as mayor from 1930-1932 and from 1938-1940. Actor Clint Eastwood served as mayor from 1986 to 1988. After the All Saints Episcopal Church was sold in 1946, a replacement church was built on Dolores Street and 9th Avenue by modernist architect Robert Jones.

Eben Whittlesey was a choir member when it was the All Saints Episcopal Church in the early 1940s. He was married in the church in 1946 and went on to be a member of the Carmel City Council in the 1950s. He became mayor from 1962 to 1964.

The Carmel-by-the-Sea Garden Club did the restoration of the Carmel City Hall's Garden in 2012. The garden was named in memory of council member Constance "Connie" Meach Ridder (1941-2011). In 2015, the garden was added to the Smithsonian Institution's Archives of American Gardens.

Albert Cauldwell

Albert Maxwell Cauldwell (1894-1948), was a San Francisco architect. He was born on February 18, 1889, in San Francisco, California. His mother was Catherine M Drew. Eleanor C. Cauldwell and John S. Cauldwell were his siblings. He belonged to the San Francisco Architectural Club. In July 1920, the California State Board of Architecture, Northern District, granted him a certificate to practice architecture in California. His office was at 251 Kerney Street, San Francisco. The 1930 United States census lists him as an architect living in San Francisco at age 36. His birthplace was California, his father's birthplace was New York, and mother's birthplace was Iowa. He was a veteran in World War I.

Works
Below is a list of works completed by Cauldwell:
 All Saints Episcopal Church (1913)
 Stockton Nurses' Home (1914)
 Santa Clara's Carmelite Monastery (1916)
 Mission Dolores Church (1921)
 Roman Catholic Archbishop of San Francisco (1923)
 Notre Dame College (1924)
 The Notre Dame School (1925)
 Telegraph Hill Homes (1929)

Cauldwell died on January 8, 1948, in San Francisco, California. He was buried at the Golden Gate National Cemetery in San Bruno, California. He left a 186 volumes on art and architecutre to the Anne Bremer Memorial Library. John Wright Burns and Ann Scott Burns of Los Gatos, California are heirs of Cauldwell.

See also
 List of mayors of Carmel-by-the-Sea, California
 List of American architects

References

External links

 Carmel City Hall – official site
 Downtown Conservation District Historic Property Survey
 Carmel-by-the-Sea City Hall, Constance Meach Ridder Memorial Garden
 Carmel-by-the-Sea Garden Club
 Carmel-by-the-Sea City Hall, Carmel-by-the-Sea, Constance Meach Ridder Memorial Garden

1913 establishments in California
Carmel-by-the-Sea, California
Buildings and structures in Monterey County, California
City halls in California
Rebuilt buildings and structures in the United States